Tessaratoma is a genus of bugs in the family Tessaratomidae. There are more than 20 described species in Tessaratoma.

Species
These 26 species belong to the genus Tessaratoma:

 Tessaratoma absimilis Distant, 1893
 Tessaratoma aethiops Distant, 1877
 Tessaratoma afzelii Stål, 1854
 Tessaratoma conspersa Stål, 1863
 Tessaratoma furcifera Walker, 1868
 Tessaratoma hornimani Distant, 1877
 Tessaratoma indica Breddin, 1909
 Tessaratoma indicta Distant, 1890
 Tessaratoma javanica (Thunberg, 1783)
 Tessaratoma kina Distant, 1909
 Tessaratoma kinta Distant, 1909
 Tessaratoma longicornis Dohrn, 1863
 Tessaratoma malaya Stål, 1870
 Tessaratoma miscella Montandon, 1894
 Tessaratoma nemorivaga Distant, 1890
 Tessaratoma nigripes Dallas, 1851
 Tessaratoma nigroscutellata Distant, 1921
 Tessaratoma oblonga Blöte, 1945
 Tessaratoma papillosa (Drury, 1770)
 Tessaratoma planicarinata Breddin, 1912
 Tessaratoma quadrata Distant, 1902
 Tessaratoma rubida Breddin, 1901
 Tessaratoma spinipes Bergroth, 1906
 Tessaratoma stictica Vollenhoven, 1868
 Tessaratoma striata Walker, 1868
 Tessaratoma timorensis Vollenhoven, 1868

References

Further reading

External links

 

Tessaratomidae